Todd O'Keefe (born November 10, 1972) is an American singer-songwriter, guitarist and bass player.  Artists O'Keefe has worked with include The 88, Ray Davies, Black Francis, Jeff Beck,   Elvis Costello and Rusty Anderson.  O'Keefe contributed background vocals to Social Distortion's 2010 release Hard Times and Nursery Rhymes.  He sang on The Posies 2016 album Solid States. He was the singer and guitarist for Los Angeles pop rock band The Green and Yellow TV.

References

1972 births
Living people
Musicians from Greenwich, Connecticut
American rock singers
The 88 members
21st-century American singers